Muhsinah  is an American Grammy Award nominated singer and producer, from Washington, D.C.

She cites Chick Corea, Herbie Hancock, Quincy Jones, Nirvana and Chopin as among her influences.

Musical career 
A graduate of the Duke Ellington School of the Arts and of Howard University, Muhsinah's self-produced EP day.break 2.0 (2008) was described by XLR8R magazine as "a beautiful smack in the face of mainstream hip-hop and R&B convention".

Though a small scale independent release, it attracted the attention of rappers Common as well as Phonte of Little Brother/The Foreign Exchange, both of whom she later recorded with, appearing on Common's Universal Mind Control and The Foreign Exchange's Leave It All Behind.

The Washington Post has written of her as being "part of a new breed of young soul rebels who seamlessly meld electronic beats with layers of jazzy arrangements and unorthodox song structure", and as "equally at home chopping loops and tapping pads on an Akai MPC as she is behind a piano keyboard".

Muhsinah was acknowledged by Radiohead frontman, Thom Yorke, on their website Dead Air Space on March 15, 2010 when he listed the song, "Lose My Fuse (Produced By Flying Lotus)" among his favorites at the time the post was published.

Awards and nominations

Discography

Extended plays

Production
Ruff Drafts Volume 1 (Track: 3) – JapaNUBIA Musik 2006
Getback (Track: 6/7 Interlude ) – ABB 2007
day.break (Tracks: All) – Rxlngr 2007
pre.lude (Tracks: All) – Circulations 2008
Higher Ground (Track: 3) – Wayna Quiet Power Productions 2008
The Awakening (Track: 3) – JapaNUBIA Musik 2008
Border Breaker (Tracks: 1,3,5) – Ghetto Falsetto 2009
The Oscillations:Sine (Tracks: All) – Rxlngr 2009
The Oscillations:Triangle (Tracks: All except 2,4,5 & 7) – Rxlngr 2009

Guest appearances
Ruff Drafts Volume 1 (Tracks: 3) – JapaNUBIA Musik 2006
I Predict A Riot (Tracks: 1 & 18) – Soulspasm Records, Inc. 2007
Cuba After Market (Tracks: 3 & 13 ) – Humble Monarch Music/Rawkus 50 2007
Producer No. 1 (Track: 7) – Fat City Records 2007
Suite903 No.15 (CD#2 Track: 16) – Fader Label 2007
Blunt Park Sessions (413) (Track: 2 ) – Rude Squire/Rawkus 50 2007
Higher Ground (Track: 3) – Quiet Power Productions 2008
Leave It All Behind (Tracks: 1, 5 & 10) – Hard Boiled 2008
Down To You 12" (Track: B1) – Planetgroove 2008
Universal Mind Control (Track: 7) – G.O.O.D/Geffen 2008
Arale 01 (Are In Be) – Arale.tv 2009
Odd Summer EP (Track: 8) – Oddisee Music 2009
Adroit Adventures 12" (Track: A2) – Ubiquity 2009
Kilawatt: V2 (Track: 1) – Kilawatt Music Limited 2010

References

www.muhsinah.com
Benji B, BBC 1Xtra, April 11, 2008.
Devin Barrett. "Half Hip Hop, Half Amazing", Issue No. 83, TRACE, August 2008.
Fritz Hahn, Rhome Anderson and David Malitz. "Nightlife Agenda", Washington Post, November 15, 2007.
Jalylah Burrell. "Muhsinah Creates Homemade Physics", Issue No. 3, FADER/F2, August 2008.

External links

"Construction", official Muhsinah video on Rxlngr Incorporated' channel @ vimeo.com
Radiohead

1983 births
Living people
American women singer-songwriters
American contraltos
American music arrangers
Record producers from Washington, D.C.
American keyboardists
American film score composers
American electronic musicians
American women pianists
American women in electronic music
21st-century American singers
21st-century American women singers
21st-century American pianists
American women record producers
Singer-songwriters from Washington, D.C.